Amir Shamsaei (born 21 March 1967) is an Iranian professional futsal coach and former player.

Personal life
He is the older brother of Vahid Shamsaei.

Honours 

 AFC Futsal Club Championship
 Champions (1): 2015 (Tasisat Daryaei)
 Iranian Futsal Super League
 Champion : 2013–14 (Dabiri)

References 

1967 births
Living people
Iranian men's futsal players
Iranian futsal coaches